Victor Klenevski was an Azerbaijani statesman who served as the Minister of Social Security of Azerbaijan Democratic Republic and was member of Azerbaijani National Council within the fourth cabinet of Azerbaijan Democratic Republic.

See also
Azerbaijani National Council
Cabinets of Azerbaijan Democratic Republic (1918-1920)
Current Cabinet of Azerbaijan Republic

References

Azerbaijan Democratic Republic politicians
Government ministers of Azerbaijan
Members of the National Assembly of the Azerbaijan Democratic Republic